Yesmail Interactive, is now known as Data Axle. The email marketing provider was previously headquartered in Portland, Oregon. Data Axle is headquartered in Dallas, Texas and has offices in San Francisco, Los Angeles, New York, Chicago, Boston, Atlanta, Omaha, Toronto, London and Singapore.

History
Yesmail first started as a Web directory in 1995 and was later named Starting Point Directory in 1997.  The website became one of the top 10 most visited sites on the web and was operated by co-owner and webmaster, Frank Addante, serial entrepreneur. The company was created after its initial business, WebPromote, Inc. and its founders, Ken Wruk, Kevin Manley, John Weiss, and Keith Speer merged with a new firm founded by Mike Santer, Alex Hern and executives David Tolmie (CEO) and Peder Jungck (CTO) in early 1999. The new firm was named Yesmail.com. The business grew based on its ability to use technology to manage its database of millions of e-mail addresses. Yesmail's growth led to a $37 million IPO in the fall of 1999, and was acquired by CMGI in 2000 for $520 million. Yesmail was later acquired by infoUSA in 2003.

In November, 2006, Yesmail agreed to pay a $50,717 civil penalty to settle Federal Trade Commission charges that it violated the CAN-SPAM Act of 2003 by sending unsolicited commercial e-mails after consumers asked it to stop doing so. The FTC charged Yesmail, "doing business as @Once" at the time of the violation in 2004, with sending e-mail messages on behalf of its clients more than 10 business days after recipients had opted out. Citing the problem as one of the minor technical issues allowed under the Act, and not a violation of federal law, Yesmail deemed the charges too costly to fight, and agreed to settle. "Doing business as @Once" means the issue related to an incident that took place in 2004 before @once Inc. (then a Portland, OR-based e-mail marketing company) was integrated (along with its liabilities) in 2005 with infoUSA's existing e-mail subsidiary Yesmail.

In April 2017, Yesmail became known as Yes Lifecycle Marketing. In 2019, it dropped "Lifecycle" and became known as Yes Marketing.  In May 2019, Yes Marketing, the  announced that it would be sunsetting Yesmail. Yes Marketing will support its proprietary Yesmail platform for the next 36 months while actively migrating current clients onto Adobe Campaign.

Acquisitions
 Markado, 2003
 @once, 2005
 Digital Connexxions, 2006

See also
 Email marketing

References

External links
 infoUSA, Inc. Company Profile

Digital marketing companies of the United States
Companies based in Omaha, Nebraska
Companies based in Portland, Oregon
Marketing companies established in 1995